Hollywood Boulevard is a major east–west street in Los Angeles, California. It runs through the Hollywood, East Hollywood, Little Armenia, Thai Town, and Los Feliz districts. Its western terminus is at Sunset Plaza Drive in the Hollywood Hills and its eastern terminus is at Sunset Boulevard in Los Feliz. Hollywood Boulevard is famous for running through the tourist areas in central Hollywood, including attractions such as the Hollywood Walk of Fame and the Ovation Hollywood shopping and entertainment complex.

Route description
Hollywood Boulevard's western terminus is at Sunset Plaza Drive in the Hollywood Hills. It then runs as a winding residential street down to Laurel Canyon Boulevard. The boulevard then proceeds due east as a major thoroughfare through Hollywood and its popular tourist areas. Part of this segment has been listed in the U.S. National Register of Historic Places as part of Hollywood Boulevard Commercial and Entertainment District. The fifteen blocks between La Brea Avenue east to Gower Street is part of the Hollywood Walk of Fame. The Ovation Hollywood shopping and entertainment complex, the home of the Dolby Theatre, is located at the corner of Hollywood Boulevard and Highland Avenue. And the intersection with Vine Street was once a symbol of Hollywood itself.

East of Gower Street, Hollywood Boulevard crosses the Hollywood Freeway (US 101) before running through East Hollywood. The portion of the boulevard between the Hollywood Freeway and Vermont Avenue forms the northern boundary of Little Armenia, while the portion between Western Avenue and Sunset Boulevard forms part of the southern boundary of Los Feliz. Thai Town is centered along the six blocks of Hollywood Boulevard between Western and Normandie Avenues. After crossing Vermont Avenue, Hollywood Boulevard heads southeast to its eastern terminus at Sunset Boulevard.

Three B (Red) Line Metro Rail stations are located on Hollywood Boulevard: Hollywood/Highland station, Hollywood/Vine station, and Hollywood/Western station.

History

1890s to 1910
Part of today's Hollywood Boulevard was called Prospect Avenue, a dusty road that ran through Hollywood towards the neighboring city of Los Angeles. In December 1899, a new railroad construction began to connect Hollywood with Los Angeles in a project that was led by Peter Beveridge, H.J. Whitley, and Griffith J. Griffith.

In May 1900, the railroad connecting Hollywood and Los Angeles was completed, and another one was under construction. In 1901, the Town of Hollywood opened the new macadamized road surface with electric railway that ran down its center between Laurel Canyon and Western. Eventually, the road was widened from 20 feet wide to almost 100 feet wide in some areas.

In 1903, Hollywood became a municipality, and Prospect Avenue became sometimes called as the Boulevard of Hollywood, albeit unofficially.

In 1910, the town of Hollywood was incorporated into Los Angeles, and Prospect Avenue was officially renamed Hollywood Boulevard.

1920s
In the early 1920s, real estate developer Charles E. Toberman (the "Father of Hollywood") envisioned a thriving Hollywood theater district. Toberman was involved in 36 real estate development projects while building the Max Factor Building, Hollywood Roosevelt Hotel and  the Hollywood Masonic Temple. He partnered with Sid Grauman, and they opened the three themed theaters: Egyptian, El Capitan ("The Captain") (1926), and Chinese.

Regional shopping district
In the 1920s the boulevard and adjacent streets became a major regional shopping district, both for everyday needs and appliances, but increasingly also for high-end clothing and accessories, in part because of the nearby film studios. Chains that opened includes Schwab's in 1921, Mullen & Bluett in 1922, I. Magnin in 1923, Myer Siegel in 1925, F. W. Grand and Newberry's (dime stores) in 1926–8, and Roos Brothers in 1929. In 1922, stock was sold to finance construction of a much larger department store at Hollywood and Vine, originally to have been a Boadway Bros. When Boadway's went out of business the next year, B. H. Dyas, a Downtown Los Angeles-based department store, opened in the  building in March 1928, then sold their lease to The Broadway in 1931 – the building still a landmark today, known as the Broadway Hollywood Building. By 1930 the shopping district consisted of over 300 stores. The area would later face competition from areas along Wilshire Boulevard: the easternmost around Bullocks Wilshire which opened in 1929, second the Miracle Mile, and finally, the shopping district of Beverly Hills, where Saks Fifth Avenue opened a store in 1938.

1940s–1960s
In 1946, Gene Autry, while riding his horse in the Hollywood Christmas Parade — which passes down Hollywood Boulevard each year on the Sunday after Thanksgiving — heard young parade watchers yelling, "Here comes Santa Claus, here comes Santa Claus!" and was inspired to write "Here Comes Santa Claus" with Oakley Haldeman.

In 1958, the Hollywood Walk of Fame, which runs from La Brea Avenue east to Gower Street (and an additional three blocks on Vine Street), was created as a tribute to artists working in the entertainment industry.

Decline
In the 1970s, the street became very seedy and was frequented by many odd characters as shown in pictures by photographer Ave Pildas.

Revitalization
In 1985, a portion of Hollywood Boulevard in Hollywood was listed in the National Register of Historic Places as part of the "Hollywood Boulevard Commercial and Entertainment District".
In 1992, the street was paved with glittery asphalt between Vine Street and La Brea Boulevard.

The El Capitan Theatre was refurbished in 1991 then damaged in the 1994 Northridge earthquake. The Hollywood Entertainment District, a self-taxing business improvement district, was formed for the properties from La Brea to McCadden on the boulevard.

The Hollywood extension of the Metro Red Line subway was opened in June 1999, running from Downtown Los Angeles to the San Fernando Valley.  Stops on Hollywood Boulevard are located at Western Avenue, Vine Street, and Highland Avenue. Metro Local lines 180 and 217 also serve Hollywood Boulevard. A Light Rail extension station is proposed at the Hollywood Blvd. and Highland Ave. intersection connection the boulevard with West Hollywood, Central LA and LAX.

An anti-cruising ordinance prohibits driving on parts of the boulevard more than twice in four hours.

Beginning in 1995, then Los Angeles City Council member Jackie Goldberg initiated efforts to clean up Hollywood Boulevard and reverse its decades-long slide into disrepute. Central to these efforts was the construction of the Hollywood and Highland Center and adjacent Dolby Theatre (originally known as the Kodak Theatre) in 2001.

In early 2006, the city made revamping plans on Hollywood Boulevard for future tourists. The three-part plan was to exchange the original streetlights with red stars into two-headed old-fashioned streetlights, put in new palm trees, and put in new stoplights. The renovations were completed in late 2006.

In the few years leading up to 2007, more than $2 billion was spent on projects in the neighborhood, including mixed-use retail and apartment complexes and new schools and museums.

In 2021, the Vogue Theater, on Hollywood Boulevard, at Las Palmas, reopened as the Vogue Multicultural Museum.

Renovations of the Hollywood and Highland Center began in 2020. The renovated complex was renamed Ovation Hollywood in 2022.

In 2022, for the return of the LA Pride parade to the boulevard, the city installed multi colored lighting to more than 100 trees to illuminate for special events.

Heart of Hollywood Master Plan
Advocates promote the idea of closing Hollywood Boulevard to traffic and create a Pedestrian zone from La Brea Avenue to Highland Avenue citing an increase in pedestrian traffic including tourism, weekly movie premiers and award shows closures, including 10 days for the Academy Award ceremony at the Dolby Theatre. Similar to other cities in the US, like Third Street Promenade, Fremont Street in Las Vegas, Market St. in San Francisco or the closure in Times Squares Pedestrian Plaza's created in 2015.

In June 2019, The City of Los Angeles commissioned Gensler architects to provide a master plan for a $4 million renovation to improve and "update the streetscape concept" for the Walk of Fame. Los Angeles City Councilmember Mitch O’Farrell released the draft master plan designed by Gensler and Studio-MLA in January 2020. It proposed widening the sidewalks, adding bike lanes, new landscaping, sidewalk dining, removing lanes of car traffic and street parking between the Pantages Theater (Gower Avenue) at the east and The Emerson Theatre (La Brea Avenue) at the west end of the boulevard. The approved phase one includes removing the parking lanes between Orange Drive and Gower Street, adding street furnishings with benches, tables and chairs with sidewalk widening. Phase two is in the schematic stage. Phase two is planned for 2024 and will include closing down the boulevard to two lanes, adding landscaping with shade trees and five public plazas made up of art deco designed street pavers and kiosks.

Major intersections

Gallery

Events 
A popular event that takes place on the Boulevard is the complete transformation of the street to a Christmas theme.  Shops and department stores attract customers by lighting their stores and the entire street with decorated Christmas trees and Christmas lights.  The street essentially becomes "Santa Claus Lane." The route of Hollywood Christmas Parade partially follows Hollywood Boulevard.

Landmarks 

 Barnsdall Art Park
 Bob Hope Square (Hollywood and Vine)
 Broadway Hollywood Building
 Chinese Theatre
 Dolby Theatre
 Grauman's Egyptian Theatre
 El Capitan Theatre
 Fonda Theatre
 Frederick's of Hollywood
 Hollywood and Highland
 Hollywood Pacific Theatre
 Hollywood Roosevelt Hotel
 Hollywood Walk of Fame
 Hollywood Wax Museum
 Hollywood Masonic Temple
 Madame Tussauds Hollywood
 Musso & Frank Grill
 Pantages Theatre
 Ripley's Believe It Or Not! Odditorium

See also 

 List of Los Angeles Historic-Cultural Monuments in Hollywood

References

External links 

 Hollywood Chamber of Commerce

 
Boulevard
Streets in Los Angeles
Boulevards in the United States
East Hollywood, Los Angeles
Historic districts in Los Angeles
Historic districts on the National Register of Historic Places in California
National Register of Historic Places in Los Angeles
Streets in Los Angeles County, California
Roads on the National Register of Historic Places in California
Former shopping districts and streets in Los Angeles